Tomoxia laticeps is a species of beetle in the genus Tomoxia of the family Mordellidae. It was described by Lea in 1895.

References

Beetles described in 1895
Tomoxia